Mostellaria is a play by the Roman author Plautus. Its name translates from Latin as "The Ghost (play)" (with the word  understood in the title). The play is believed to be an adaptation of a lost comedy of the Athenian poet Philemon called Phasma (the Ghost). It is set in a street in the city of Athens.

Characters

Main characters 
Theopropides - an Athenian merchant
Philolaches - Theopropides' son
Tranio - Slave owned by Theopropides
Philematium - A courtesan who has been set free by Philolaches
Callidamates - Friend of Philolaches
Simo - Theopropides' neighbour
Misargyrides - A moneylender

Minor characters 
Grumio - Country slave, owned by Theopropides
Sphaerio - Slave owned by Theopropides
Scapha - Philematium's attendant
Delphium - Callidamates' girlfriend
Phaniscus - Callidamates' slave
Pinacium - Callidamates' slave

Plot 
A young man named Philolaches is having a great time while his father Theopropides is overseas on business. Philolaches has borrowed a lot of money to buy the freedom of the slave-girl he loves. One day, he is having a party in the street with his friends, when his slave Tranio interrupts the merry-making to announce that Philolaches' father has returned unexpectedly and will arrive from the harbour at any minute. Amid the general panic, Tranio has an idea. He hustles Philolaches and his friends into the house and locks the door. The father now arrives. Tranio greets him respectfully but pretends that it is dangerous to enter the house because it is haunted by the ghost of a man once killed there.

Unfortunately, at this moment a money-lender turns up to claim the money that Philolaches borrowed. Tranio thinks quickly and pretends that the money was borrowed to buy the house next door. Even after Philolaches' father meets the real owner of the house, Tranio manages to hide the truth for some time, but he is finally found out and jumps on top of an altar to escape punishment. Fortunately, all ends happily when one of Philolaches' friends offers to repay the debt, allowing the father to forgive his son. Even Tranio is forgiven.

The play is set in a street in Athens. The houses of Theopropides and his neighbour Simo face the audience. Between them is a narrow alley leading to the garden door of Simo's house. There is an altar between the stage and the audience. To the audience's left the road leads to the harbour, and on the right to the forum.

Division into acts
Plautus's plays are traditionally divided into five acts; these are referred to here for convenience, since many editions make use of them. However, it is not thought that they go back to Plautus's time, since no manuscript contains them before the 15th century. Also, the acts themselves do not always match the structure of the plays, which is more clearly shown by the variation in metres.

Metrical structure

The different scenes of the play are clearly differentiated by changes of metre. The usual pattern is to begin each section with iambic senarii (which were spoken without music), then a scene of music in various metres. Moore calls this the "ABC" metrical succession. In this play, the pattern is varied from ABC, ABC... as follows:

ABBC, BC, AB(C), ABC, BC, AC

C. W. Marshall (2006), however, who sees the metrical sections (or "arcs") as always starting with iambic senarii, divides the play into just four sections as follows: 
ABBCBC, AB(C), ABCBC, AC

The play contains five songs: three of them polymetric, using a range of different metres, involving young men and slaves; and one each of cretic and bacchiac, involving the old men Simo and Theopropides. There is also a section of 90 lines of iambic septenarii (a metre often associated with prostitutes) when the prostitute Philematium is chatting with her maid Scapha.

The scene is set
Act 1.1 (lines 1–83): iambic senarii (80 lines)
The country slave Grumio chides city-slave Tranio for wasting their master's money

Act 1.2 (84–156): polymetric song (bacchiac, iambic, cretic, ending with 3 lines of trochaic septenarii) (70 lines)
The young man Philolaches ruefully contemplates his wasteful way of life.

Act 1.3 (154–247): iambic septenarii (90 lines)
Philolaches overhears his girlfriend Philematium and her slave Scapha talking about him.

Act 1.3 (248–312): trochaic septenarii (61 lines)
Philolaches sends Scapha away and talks to Philematium.

Disaster strikes

Act 1.4 (313–347): polymetric song (bacchiac, cretic, anapaestic, reizianum) (35 lines)
Philolaches's friend Callidamates arrives, very drunk, with his girlfriend Delphium.

Act 2.1 (348–408): trochaic septenarii (60 lines)
The slave Tranio brings news that Philocrates' father has returned from his trip. He ushers the young men into the house

Tranio tricks Theopropides

Act 2.1–3.1 (409–689): iambic senarii (277 lines)
Tranio addresses the audience. He locks the house door. – Philolaches' father Theopropides arrives. Tranio persuades him that the house is haunted. – Next he fends off the money-lender, persuading Theopropides that the money was borrowed as a downpayment on a new house.

Act 3.2 (690–743): mostly cretic (54 lines)
The neighbour Simo comes out complaining about his wife. Tranio flatters Simo. He tells him about his difficult situation.

Act 3.2 (744–747): tr7, ia8, ia7 (3 lines)
Tranio begs Simo not to betray him to his master.

Tranio tricks Simo
Act 3.2 (747–782): iambic senarii (36 lines)
Tranio tricks Simo into letting Theopropides inspect his house.

Act 3.3 (783–804): bacchiac (ending with 1 line of tr8) (22 lines)
Tranio leads Theopropides over to Simo's house

Act 3.3 (805–857): trochaic septenarii (53 lines)
Theopropides converses with Simo and begins his inspection of Simo's house, believing falsely that Simo has agreed to sell it.

Theopropides discovers the truth

Act 4.1 (858–903): polymetric song (mixed metres) (46 lines)
Callidamates's two slaves, Phaniscus and Pinacium, arrive to collect their master. They exchange banter.

Act 4.2 (904–992): trochaic septenarii (89 lines)
When Tranio has gone to fetch Philolaches, Theopropides gets into conversation with the two slaves and discovers the truth.

Tranio escapes punishment

Act 4.3 (993–1040): iambic senarii (49 lines)
Theopropides meets Simo and they both realise they have been tricked. They determine to punish Tranio.

Act 5.1–5.2 (1041–1181): trochaic septenarii (138 lines)
Tranio realises that he has been exposed. He flees to the nearby altar to avoid punishment. Philocrates' friend Callidamates appears and persuades Theopropides to forgive both Philolaches and Tranio.

Adaptations
Mostellaria is one of several Plautus plays used as inspiration for the Stephen Sondheim, Burt Shevelove and Larry Gelbart 1962 musical A Funny Thing Happened on the Way to the Forum. The character Erroneous returns from being abroad to be told his house is haunted and must walk seven times around the seven hills of Rome to remove the ghosts.

Kevin P. Joyce's play When the Cat's Away is loosely based on Mostellaria, transposing the story from Athens to modern day Nantucket.

Rachel Beth Cunning simplified and adapted the play to create more comprehensible reading materials for Latin 3 and Latin 4 students in a high school classroom.

References 

 Plautus, The Rope and Other Plays, translated by E. F. Watling, Penguin, London, 1964, .

External Links
 The Latin text of the Mostellaria, at the Perseus Project
 Mostellaria, or the Haunted House, translated into English by Henry Thomas Riley, published 1912, via the Perseus Project

Plays by Plautus
Plays set in Athens
Plays set in ancient Greece
Ghosts in popular culture